Pritchardia minor, the Alakai Swamp pritchardia  or loulu, is a palm native to Hawaii.

Description
The leaves are yellowish when they emerge, and this color is sometimes maintained on the undersides of mature leaves. The leaves are leathery and smooth above, but the undersides are waxy and have a covering of greyish to yellowish tomentum (felt) beneath. The shiny black fruits of this palm are ovoid, about 2 cm by 13 mm, and contain a seed up to 15 mm in diameter. It is not endangered.

Cultivation
This palm prefers a sunny, well drained, and moist location.

Common names
Alakaʻi Swamp pritchardia
Alakaʻi loulu

Synonyms
Pritchardia eriophora

References

 Palm and Cycad Society of Australia Pritchardia minor, accessed 28 April 2008.
 Jones, David L, 1995. Palms Throughout the World. Smithsonian Institution Press, Washington DC.

minor
Trees of Hawaii
Endemic flora of Hawaii
Biota of Kauai
Taxa named by Odoardo Beccari
Plants described in 1910